Marmara fulgidella is a moth of the family Gracillariidae. It is known from the United States (including Pennsylvania).

The larvae feed on Castanea and Quercus species, including Quercus prinus. They mine trunks and branches of their host plant. The mine has the form of a long winding gallery just under the epidermis of young trunks and branches.

References

External links
Marmara at microleps.org
mothphotographersgroup

Gracillariinae
Moths described in 1860